Mana Addullah Sulaiman is a paralympic athlete from United Arab Emirates competing mainly in category F32 or F51 throwing events.

Mana competed in the 2000 Summer Paralympics in the F51 club throw and discus but failed to win any medals.  Four years later at the 2004 Summer Paralympics he competed out of his wheelchair in the F32 shot put winning a silver medal.

References

Paralympic athletes of the United Arab Emirates
Athletes (track and field) at the 2000 Summer Paralympics
Athletes (track and field) at the 2004 Summer Paralympics
Paralympic silver medalists for the United Arab Emirates
Club throwers
Living people
Medalists at the 2004 Summer Paralympics
Year of birth missing (living people)
Paralympic medalists in athletics (track and field)
Emirati shot putters